Alexis Readinger (born May 7, 1975) is an American hospitality designer based in Los Angeles. She is the founder of Preen, Inc.

Early life 
Alexis Readinger grew up in Ft. Worth, TX. She received a master's degree in architecture from University of California, Los Angeles in 1999 and a bachelor's degree from Vanderbilt University in 1996.

Career 
Readinger began designing restaurants in 1999, formerly with Dodd Mitchell and with Thomas Schoos.

In 2016, she was invited to select the national Restaurant Design Award winners for the American Institute of Architects Los Angeles (AIALA). Her work has been featured in Architectural Digest, Interior Design, Elle Decor and The New York Times .

Notable clients include Chefs Susan Feniger, Mary Sue Milliken, Johnny Ray Zone, Karen and Quinn Hatfield, Jacques and Hasty Torres, Sweet Lady Jane,  Akasha Richmond, Jeremy Fox and Jon Bonnell. Her work has been featured in Flip That Restaurant, and Desksides on the Design Network.

She is an active board member of the Los Angeles Chinatown Business Improvement District (BID) and serves on the board of the Chung King Road Association. Her firm, Preen, Inc. curates the closing party to the Los Angeles Design Festival.

Awards 
 Winner of the 11th Annual American Institute of Architects (AIA/LA) Jury Award for Best Restaurant Design, Odys + Penelope, 2015.
 Finalist for the 9th Annual American Institute of Architects (AIA/LA) Design Awards for Best Restaurant Design, Waters, 2014
 Winner, Boutique 18 – recognizing the Nation's top upcoming hospitality designers, Boutique Design, 2009.
 Winner of the 3rd Annual American Institute of Architects (AIA/LA) Jury Award for Best Bar and Lounge Design, Omega, 2007

References 

1975 births
University of California, Los Angeles alumni
Living people
American designers
Vanderbilt University alumni
American interior designers
Architects from Los Angeles